Guðlaugur Pétur Pétursson (born 27 June 1959 in Akranes) is a retired Icelandic footballer who was active as a forward.

Club career
Pétur made his professional debut at ÍA and also played for Feyenoord Rotterdam, RSC Anderlecht (35), Royal Antwerp FC, Hércules CF, KR and Tindastóll.

International career
Pétur played 41 caps for Iceland, scoring 11 goals. He played his last international match in September 1990 against France.

Honours
 1977 : Úrvalsdeild winner with ÍA
 1978 : Icelandic Cup winner with ÍA
 1979–80 : KNVB Cup winner with Feyenoord
 1986 : Icelandic Cup winner with ÍA

References

External links
 Profile at Feyenoord Online
 

1959 births
Living people
Association football forwards
Petur Petursson
Petur Petursson
Petur Petursson
Feyenoord players
R.S.C. Anderlecht players
Royal Antwerp F.C. players
Hércules CF players
Petur Petursson
Eredivisie players
Petur Petursson
Petur Petursson
Expatriate footballers in the Netherlands
Petur Petursson
Expatriate footballers in Belgium
Petur Petursson
Expatriate footballers in Spain
Petur Petursson
Petur Petursson
Petur Petursson
Petur Petursson
Petur Petursson
Icelandic football managers
Ungmennafélagið Tindastóll men's football players